Raimo Olavi Summanen (born March 2, 1962) is a former professional ice hockey forward and the current head coach of HIFK of the Finnish Elite League. He is also a former coach of the Finnish national team. He was selected by the Edmonton Oilers in the sixth round of the 1982 NHL Entry Draft, 125th overall, and spent his NHL career with Edmonton and the Vancouver Canucks.

Playing career
In 1984 Summanen, who was born in Jyväskylä, joined the Edmonton Oilers from Europe at the end of the regular season. He played 2 regular season games, and 5 playoff games. Summanen has a 1984 Stanley Cup ring, and is part of Edmonton Oilers first Stanley Cup winning picture. His name was left off the Cup, because he did not officially qualify.

Summanen also played extensively in Finland, both before and after his NHL days, and in the American Hockey League. He played for the Finnish national team when they won their first Ice Hockey World Championships gold medal in 1995, and retired after the tournament.

Coaching career
Summanen coached the Finnish National Team to a 2nd-place finish in the 2004 World Cup of Hockey. However, his reported abrasiveness with players and management led to his dismissal. Even during Finland's successful World Cup performance, defenceman Janne Niinimaa left the team after "conflicts with the coaching staff." He also had a testy relationship with the national team's manager, Timo Jutila.

In 2010, Summanen succeeded Igor Nikitin as the head coach of Avangard Omsk, a leading KHL side. The team went from strength to strength and ended up as the top team of the regular season (largely due to an impressive 18-game winning streak lasting from December to February). However, some players were reportedly unhappy with Summanen's abrasive coaching methods. He was relieved of his coaching duties before game 7 of the Eastern Conference semifinals, which the team went on to lose. The club cited health issues as an official explanation. However, according to anonymous sources within the team, the real reason behind it was a major conflict with the players. There were reports that Summanen even tried to challenge Avangard's star Jaromír Jágr to a fight.

Career statistics

Regular season and playoffs

International

Awards
 SM-liiga, Kanada-malja (3): 1992–93, 1993–94, 1994–95
 IIHF European Cup (1): 1994
 Veli-Pekka Ketola trophy for most points scored in the SM-liiga regular season - 1989 and 1990

head coach
 SM-liiga, Kanada-malja (1): 2001–02
Kalevi Numminen trophy for best coach in the SM-liiga - 2002
 IIHF Continental Cup (1): 2002–03
 World Cup of Hockey  (1): 2004
 KHL, Continental Cup (1): 2010–11
 KHL, Gagarin Cup (1): 2011-12
 Alps Hockey League, (1): 2020–21

Transactions
March 10, 1987 - Edmonton trades Summanen to Vancouver in exchange for Moe Lemay

References

External links

Fired from Team Finland

1962 births
Edmonton Oilers draft picks
Edmonton Oilers players
Finland men's national ice hockey team coaches
Finnish ice hockey left wingers
Finnish ice hockey coaches
Finnish ice hockey world championship gold medalists
Flint Spirits players
Fredericton Express players
HPK players
Ice hockey players at the 1984 Winter Olympics
Ice hockey players at the 1992 Winter Olympics
Ilves players
Jokerit players
Living people
Nova Scotia Oilers players
Olympic ice hockey players of Finland
Sportspeople from Jyväskylä
St. Louis Blues scouts
SC Bern players
Stanley Cup champions
HC TPS players
Vancouver Canucks players